The 1994 Midwestern Collegiate Conference men's basketball tournament (now known as the Horizon League men's basketball tournament) was held March 6–8 at Hinkle Fieldhouse in Indianapolis, Indiana.

 defeated  in the championship game, 72–63, to win their first MCC/Horizon League men's basketball tournament title. Evansville was denied a third straight tournament title.

The Titans, however, did not receive a bid to the 1994 NCAA tournament, because with Dayton and Duquesne leaving the league before the season, they did not have enough members that had continuous membership in the conference for the preceding five years. They regained their automatic bid the following year, when seven new members joined the league.

Format
All six conference members participated in the tournament and were seeded based on regular season conference records.

Bracket

References

Horizon League men's basketball tournament
Tournament
Midwestern City Conference men's basketball tournament
Midwestern City Conference men's basketball tournament